Lithuanian resistance may refer to:
Resistance in Lithuania during World War II
Lithuanian partisans, resistance against Soviet regime after World War II